Joel Taufa’ao (birth unknown) is an Australian rugby league footballer who has played in the 2000s.

Background
Joel Taufaʻao was born in Newcastle, New South Wales, Australia.

Playing career
Taufa'ao has also appeared on several occasions for Tonga including at the 2006 Pacific Cup and Federation Shield competitions.

In August 2008, Taufa'ao was named in the Tonga training squad for the 2008 Rugby League World Cup, and in October 2008 he was named in the final 24-man Tonga squad.

References

Living people
Australian sportspeople of Tongan descent
Australian rugby league players
Central Coast Centurions players
Rugby league centres
Rugby league halfbacks
Rugby league players from Newcastle, New South Wales
Tonga national rugby league team players
Year of birth missing (living people)